The Jylgyndy Forest Reserve is located in the Toktomat Zulpuev rural community, Nookat District, Osh Region, Kyrgyzstan. It was established in 1975 with a purpose of conservation of pistachio (Pistacia vera) habitat. The forest reserve occupies 300 hectares.

References

Osh Region
Protected areas established in 1975
Forest reserves of Kyrgyzstan